Chief Records, together with its Profile and Age subsidiaries, was an independent record label that operated from 1957 to 1964.  Best known for its recordings of Chicago blues artists Elmore James, Junior Wells, Magic Sam, and Earl Hooker, the label had a diverse roster and included R&B artists Lillian Offitt and Ricky Allen.

Chief Records was founded in Chicago in 1957 by Mel London, a 25-year-old R&B entrepreneur.  London served as producer and wrote several of the label's best-known songs.  Earl Hooker, one of the most well-regarded blues guitarists of his era, was an important contributor to the label.  He worked closely with London and "was involved in over a dozen recording sessions, and his playing was featured on some forty titles and twenty-five singles, a dozen of which were released under his own name, the rest being ascribed to Junior Wells, A.C. Reed, Lillian Offitt, and Ricky Allen". Among Hooker's recordings are several slide-guitar instrumentals, including the 1961 Age single "Blue Guitar", which Muddy Waters later overdubbed a vocal and titled it "You Shook Me".

"Little by Little", written by Mel London, was a hit for Junior Wells, reaching number 23 in the Billboard R&B chart in 1960.  Wells continued to perform and record several of his Chief and Profile songs ("Messin' with the Kid", "Come on in This House", and "It Hurts Me Too") during his career.  "Cut You Loose", another London composition, was a hit for Ricky Allen; the song reached number 20 in 1963.  Next to Wells, Allen had the most singles on the label (all on Age).

As with many independent blues labels in the early 1960s, Chief was plagued by financial problems.  First to be discontinued were the Chief and Profile labels; finally the Age label was discontinued in 1964 and the company went out of business.  During its seven years of operation, Chief/Profile/Age released about 80 singles (including reissues) from approximately 37 artists.  Later, various singles (including reissues) by Chief artists were released by All-Points Records, Mel/Mel-Lon Records, Bright Star Records, and Starville Records, but none had the impact of the originals.

Partial discography

References

Sources

External links

American record labels
Blues record labels
Rhythm and blues record labels
Record labels established in 1957
Record labels disestablished in 1964